Calochortus catalinae is a species of mariposa lily known by the common name Santa Catalina mariposa lily.

Distribution
The bulb is endemic to Southern California. It is native along the coastline in grasslands and open chaparral and woodlands habitats, especially on the Channel Islands and in the Santa Monica Mountains. It is also found in other Transverse Ranges,  the Santa Ana Mountains of the Peninsular Ranges, and the Outer South California Coast Ranges.

Description
Calochortus catalinae produces long basal leaves and tall, branching stems up to 60 centimeters high.

The purple-tinted sepals are up to 3 centimeters long and the longer petals are usually white or very pale pink with a blotch of purple or deep red at the bases. The bowl of the petals may have sparse long hairs. The anthers are usually light in color, often pink.

They are also perennial.

References

External links

Calflora Database: Calochortus catalinae (Catalina mariposa,  Catalina mariposa lily)
Jepson Manual (TJM93) Treatment of Calochortus catalinae
USDA Plants Profile for Calochortus catalinae
UC Photos gallery — Calochortus catalinae

catalinae
Endemic flora of California
Natural history of the California chaparral and woodlands
Natural history of the Channel Islands of California
Natural history of the Peninsular Ranges
Natural history of the Santa Monica Mountains
Natural history of the Transverse Ranges